Rumex thyrsiflorus, also known commonly as the compact dock or thyrse sorrel, is a perennial herb, which grows in meadows and wasteland in most parts of Europe. It is somewhat similar to common sorrel (Rumex acetosa).

References

External links
 Nordic virtual flora 
 Flora Europaea 

thyrsiflorus
Flora of Europe